Stefan Haudum (born 27 November 1994) is an Austrian professional footballer who plays as a midfielder for Rheindorf Altach.

Club career
He made his Austrian Football First League debut for FC Blau-Weiß Linz on 2 November 2012 in a game against SV Horn.

References

External links
 

1994 births
People from Eferding District
Living people
Austrian footballers
FC Blau-Weiß Linz players
LASK players
SC Rheindorf Altach players
2. Liga (Austria) players
Austrian Football Bundesliga players
Association football midfielders
Footballers from Upper Austria